Montmaur may refer to the following places in France:

 Montmaur, Hautes-Alpes, a commune in the department of Hautes-Alpes
 Montmaur, Aude, a commune in the department of Aude